Hebron Academy, founded in 1804, is a small, independent, college preparatory boarding and day school for boys and girls in grades six through postgraduate in Hebron, Maine.

History
Hebron Academy is one of the nation's oldest endowed preparatory schools: the school was chartered in 1804 and opened its doors in 1805. In 2004, the school observed its 200th anniversary.  It is located in Hebron, Maine.

Early history
Hebron Academy was founded by American Revolutionary War veterans from Massachusetts who received land in the District of Maine as compensation for their military service. They settled the community in the late 18th century, established a church, and then chartered the school in 1804. The early settlers faced many challenges, including making a living in the wilderness, building a community, governing themselves, and educating young people in such a thinly populated settlement.

Among the settlers was Deacon William Barrows, who led the effort to establish Hebron Academy and was a member of its Board of Trustees for 33 years, until his death in 1837. Interest in the school stretched well beyond the small settlement of Hebron. Five of the nine original trustees came from surrounding towns including New Gloucester, Paris, Turner, and Minot.

The school opened its doors in 1805 to 25 young scholars, boys and girls. Many students rented rooms from Deacon Barrows and area farmers. By 1807, there were 50 students. The first dorm would not be built until 1829. From the beginning, Hebron was an inclusive, welcoming community. Girls learned alongside boys. In the 19th century and early 20th century students arrived from Mongolia, Burma, India, and Bulgaria.

The school year in the 19th century was very different from what is typical today, as was the organization of classes. The schedule was often affected by the weather and farming needs. Courses started fresh during the terms to accommodate short-term students who arrived from farms or workshops. There was a college-prep track, and a non-college-prep track (girls were not going on to college). Some students were as young as 10, while others were 30-year-old war veterans. Enrollment varied widely depending on the term.

Early subjects included Latin, Greek, French, German, Spanish, and Italian, English, mathematics, geography, history, natural sciences (anatomy, physiology, mineralogy, astronomy, botany, natural philosophy or physics, and chemistry), civil polity, logic, rhetoric, mental philosophy, English grammar, parsing, Webster's dictionary, and English composition. Debating was an important activity for many years.

The school was not organized into classes and students did not officially graduate. Those planning to attend college studied until they felt they had prepared enough to pass a college entrance exam. Many Hebron students went on to Dartmouth, Harvard, Bowdoin, and Colby. The school began official commencement exercises in 1878. Commencement exercises would last all day, with dozens of speeches and music recitals.

1900s
Around 1913, girls' registration at the school began declining.  By this time, several hundred Maine girls were attending normal schools for teacher training, and they did not need a high school diploma to enter these schools.  At the same time, free public schools were improving.  In the spring of 1922, only 36 girls registered.  After graduation that year Hebron Academy became a boys' school.
When World War I arrived, at least three faculty men resigned to enter the war and several students enlisted.  Many alumni also fought in the war.  Harold T. Andrews (1914) died in the battle of Cambrai in 1917, and was the first Maine soldier to die in the war.  A Portland post of the America Legion carries his name.  Philip Frothingham (1915) was killed in an airplane accident in France and the Portland post of the Veterans of Foreign Wars bears his name.  World War II had a far greater impact on the school.  Twenty-eight students left school in 1943 to join the armed forces.  In May of that year, the school closed and would remain closed until 1945.
In 1969, applications began to decline.  It was part of a trend common among independent boarding schools.  In the early 1970s, Hebron returned to its roots by reopening its doors to girls and welcoming young people from the area to attend as day students.

Sports and activities
Hebron organized its first baseball game in 1862.  Gould Academy, Bridgton Academy, Norway High School and Hebron Academy formed a county athletic league in 1890.  Hebron held its first annual “Athletic Exhibition,” with the horizontal bar, parallel bars, Swedish horse, flying rings, and tumbling, in 1896.  Hockey began in 1921 and Hebron was home to America's first covered school ice arena in 1925.  Winter sports (ski, snowshoe rac, skating) in 1925, and swimming in 1930.  In 1931, Hebron teams won state championships in football, cross-country, basketball, hockey, outdoor track, and baseball.

Hebron held its first annual winter carnival in 1927.  An Outing Club started in the 1930s and maintained camps on nearby Streaked Mountain and Marshall Pond.  Music was a popular activity, and the school had several groups, including a dance band, orchestra, and vocal quartet.

The school established a Cum Laude chapter in 1927 to honor students for scholastic achievement. Cum Laude is a national honor society for independent schools.  Green Key, which hosts guests and provides campus tours, started in 1949. Hebron held its first reunion in 1883 and alumni associations began meeting in New York City, Boston, and Portland around 1913.

Heads of school
 William E. Sargent, 1885–1921
 Ernest C. Marriner, 1921-1921
 James W. Howlett, 1921–1922
 Ralph L. Hunt, 1922–1943
 Claude L. Allen Jr., 1946–1972
 David Rice, 1972–1977
 John Leyden, 1977–1985
 Richard B. Davidson, 1985-1986
 David Buran, 1986–1991
 Ray Nelson, 1991-1992
 Richard B. Davidson, 1992–1999
 Paul C. Domingue, 1999–2001
 John J. King, 2001–2016
 Dan J. Marchetti, 2016–2021
 Mary Warner, 2021–2022, Acting Head of School
 Patrick J. Phillips, 2022—Present

Academics
Hebron offers a traditional college-preparatory curriculum with several Advanced Placement and Honors options and with offerings in subjects such as religion and philosophy, fine and performing arts, and environmental studies. The school is a member of the Cum Laude Society.
Areas of study include English, Mathematics and Computer Studies, Social Studies, Languages, Science, Fine and Performing Arts, and Religion and Ethics.
AP options include English, Biology, Chemistry, Physics, Calculus, Art, Latin, French, and Spanish.

Athletics
Students participate in a wide variety of seasonal interscholastic sports at both the varsity and sub varsity levels. Hebron Academy competes with public and independent schools from Maine and New England. The Academy requires all students, with the exception of those students with physical disabilities, to participate in the school's athletic program at least two of the three seasons of the school year. The third season may also be devoted to athletics or to another afternoon activity. Each athlete participating in a sport is assigned to a team based on his or her demonstrated ability or potential.

Special programs

The Outdoor Education Program
Hebron Academy's setting, including  with three mountains, two lakes, two stands of second growth forest, several miles of trails, two waterfront campsites, a number of pitches for rock climbing and a fully stocked outdoor center and boathouse, offers students opportunities for outdoor recreation and learning. The Academy's Director of Outdoor Education is a Registered Maine Guide, Wilderness First Responder, NATO certified telemark ski instructor and NWS certified weather spotter, and the program's faculty includes two Registered Maine Guides, two Wilderness First Responders, an EMT and many outdoor enthusiasts.
The Outdoor Education Program is a co-curricular program which meets every afternoon after classes. This program satisfies Hebron Academy's physical activity requirement.
The standards of the program are set in part by the Junior Maine Guide Certification program. Students learn orienteering, low-impact camping, wet day fires, trip planning and many other skills. It also teaches wilderness first aid and emergency procedures, flat and whitewater paddling, snowshoeing, rock climbing, backpacking, mountaineering and leadership skills. Students learn how to sensibly acquire and use appropriate gear and clothing. Each season there is an overnight trip planned by the students. Overnights have included camping on Mount Washington and on the Maine coast.

Postgraduate program
Each year, 15-20 students enroll in the Hebron Academy postgraduate program to improve study and organizational skills, enhance athletic or artistic talents, and continue their personal growth. They are fully active members of the school community, participating academically, artistically, athletically, and socially.

Travel abroad
Each year, Hebron Academy typically offers one or more trips abroad, arranged by its Language teachers. Trips are planned based on student interests. Recent trips have included Peru, Italy, and France. There is often a trip to nearby Quebec City as well.

The trips are intended to immerse students in the life, food, language, and customs of a different country. They gain practice using the local language.

As part of the Travel Abroad program, Hebron students have visited the orphanage Little Field Home in Ntaja, Malawi.

Entrepreneurship Program
Hebron Academy offers an Entrepreneurship Program, focusing on entrepreneurial learning, teaching and practice. Students learn entrepreneurial skills by interacting with successful entrepreneurs, launching for-profit and non-profit ventures, and participating in business competitions. The program is intended to teach students the basics of business leadership, management and planning.

In the fall, visiting alumni and friends return to campus for keynote presentations by entrepreneurs.

The Entrepreneurial Challenge competition provides students with the opportunity to develop successful business ventures from January to the end of April. The competition is limited to 18-24 students with preference given to Juniors and Seniors. Teams of 3-4 students receive start-up money to develop an idea, determine a strategy, create a business and generate revenue. Teams have the opportunity to consult with business mentors via email or phone.

Members of the internal and external Hebron community play roles through connections established by the Entrepreneurship Program. Adult participation generally involves being a mentor, speaker or judge.

Middle school
The Hebron Academy Middle School offers a curriculum, programs in fine arts, drama, and music, outdoor education, athletics, special trips, and other opportunities for students in sixth through eighth grades.

Notable alumni
 Leon Leonwood Bean, businessman
 Jose Gumbs, football player
 Hannibal Hamlin, 15th Vice President of the United States
 Ayumi Horie, artist
 Ben Jessome, politician 
 William MacVane, politician and surgeon
 Sean Morey, football player
 George Lincoln Rockwell, Neo-Nazi politician
 Robert A. Rushworth, U.S.A.F. major general and astronaut
 John Brown Russwurm, journalist and governor of the Republic of Maryland
 Tim Sample, comedian
 Freelan Oscar Stanley, inventor
 Stanley R. Tupper, politician
 Donald Valle, restaurateur

See also
Sturtevant Hall

References

4. Maine Voices
https://www.centralmaine.com/media/video/maine-voices-live-with-ayumi-horie/

External links
 Hebron Academy
 The Association of Boarding School profile

Educational institutions established in 1804
Boarding schools in Maine
Schools in Oxford County, Maine
Private high schools in Maine
Private middle schools in Maine
Preparatory schools in Maine
Hebron, Maine